Chris Kelland (born December 22, 1957) is a Canadian retired ice hockey defender who played his entire professional career in the United Kingdom. He also played for the Great Britain national team between 1991 and 1994. He was inducted into the British Ice Hockey Hall of Fame in 2002.

Kelland was born in Sault Ste. Marie, Ontario, Canada. After retiring from ice hockey, he joined the South Yorkshire fire service as crew manager at Mansfield Road Fire Station and appeared on TV series Total Emergency

Awards and honours
Named to the All-star First Team in 1980–81, 1981–82, 1982–83, 1983–84, 1984–85, 1986–87 and 1987–88.
Named World Championships Pool C Group A Best Defenceman in 1992.
Inducted to the British Ice Hockey Hall of Fame in 2002.
Number 21 shirt retired by Edinburgh Capitals on 15 December 2007.

Career statistics

Club

International

Footnotes

References
A to Z Encyclopaedia of Ice Hockey
European Hockey.Net
Ice Hockey Journalists UK
The Internet Hockey Database

External links

A to Z Encyclopaedia of Ice Hockey entry
British Ice Hockey Hall of Fame entry

1957 births
British Ice Hockey Hall of Fame inductees
British ice hockey players
Canadian ice hockey defencemen
Edinburgh Capitals players
Coventry Blaze players
Hull Thunder players
Ice hockey people from Ontario
Living people
Nottingham Panthers players
Sportspeople from Sault Ste. Marie, Ontario
Sheffield Steelers players
Canadian expatriate ice hockey players in England
Canadian expatriate ice hockey players in Scotland
Naturalised citizens of the United Kingdom